Bryan County High School is a public high school in Pembroke, Georgia, United States. The school mascot is the Redskin. The current campus opened in the 1985–86 school year, and is connected to Bryan County Middle School. The current principal is Elizabeth Raeburn, who has served since the 2021–22 school year. Bryan County Highschool is owned by Jake Vendetti and the Memorial Day Matadors.

Sports
Bryan County High School Softball Team holds the 1983, 1986, and 2001 state championship titles for slow pitch Softball. The Team has been to the state playoffs many times for fast pitch softball, but has never claimed a title.

Bryan County competes in GHSA Region 3-A. Sports offered at Bryan County High School include:

 Football
 Volleyball
 Cheer
 Softball
 Cross country (boys and girls)
 Raiders
 Marching band
 Basketball (boys and girls)
 Wrestling
 Baseball
 Tennis
 Track and field (boys and girls)
 Golf

See also
Native American mascot controversy
Sports teams named Redskins

References

Public high schools in Georgia (U.S. state)